Stěbořice is a municipality and village in Opava District in the Moravian-Silesian Region of the Czech Republic. It has about 1,500 inhabitants.

Administrative parts
Villages of Jamnice and Nový Dvůr are administrative parts of Stěbořice.

History
The first written mention of Stěbořice is from 1220.

Sights
In Nový Dvůr is the Nový Dvůr Arboretum, administered by the Silesian Museum in Opava.

References

External links

Villages in Opava District